The Comedy is a 2012 American metamodern film directed and co-written by Rick Alverson, and starring Tim Heidecker. Supporting actors include Eric Wareheim (Tim and Eric), James Murphy (LCD Soundsystem), and Gregg Turkington (better known as Neil Hamburger). The film premiered at the 2012 Sundance Film Festival and screened within such festivals as Maryland Film Festival 2012. The film was distributed by Tribeca Film and theatrically released on November 9, 2012. It went nationwide on demand starting October 24, 2012.

Despite the title and use of comedians as actors, Sundance festival chief programmer Trevor Groth says that the film is not a comedy, but instead "a provocation, a critique of a culture based at its core around irony and sarcasm and about ultimately how hollow that is."

The film was deliberately leaked onto various torrent websites, though the file only shows the first ten minutes before abruptly cutting to Heidecker sitting silently on a boat behind a scrolling anti-piracy statement.

Plot 
Swanson (Heidecker) is an aging, upper class hipster who alternately feels apathy and resentment towards his surroundings. He lives on a boat and spends his time partying and wandering around Brooklyn with his equally privileged friends, humorlessly ridiculing the various people they encounter. In the beginning of the film, his father is comatose, and Swanson is set to inherit his estate. He mentions having a brother who is institutionalized, though it is unclear where. The only familiar connection he has appears to be his sister-in-law (Liza Kate).

The film has no clear narrative, instead showing vignettes of Swanson's offensive behavior as he improvises situations to make strangers and acquaintances uncomfortable. Swanson and his buddies (Eric Wareheim, James Murphy, Richard Swift) continuously mock their less intelligent friend Cargill (Jeff Jensen) after he confesses they are important to him. Cargill continues spending time with them regardless. Swanson flirts with a woman at a party while sarcastically praising Hitler. She's sleeping naked in Swanson's boat the next morning, and he solemnly ferries her back to land. Swanson and his friends visit a church, where they desecrate various objects and cause a scene. Swanson visits a bar in Harlem alone, flaunting his wealth and insulting the African-American patrons by suggesting he gentrify the place. At one point, Swanson pays a cab driver 400 dollars to let him drive the car, only to speed recklessly and harass a woman on the street.

Growing bored, Swanson finds part-time work as a dishwasher. His ironic sense of humor attracts the attention of a waitress (Kate Lyn Sheil), who he later takes onto his boat. As Swanson awkwardly fails to make a move, the woman suffers a seizure. Rather than help, he watches her with vague interest. One night, Swanson's friend Van (Wareheim) shows their group a slideshow of photos from his childhood, interspersing vintage pornographic images as a gag.  Despite some initial laughs, the group eventually falls silent and everyone appears apathetic. In the final sequence, Swanson visits the beach, where he plays in the water with a young child, an activity he seems to genuinely enjoy.

Cast 
 Tim Heidecker as Swanson
 Eric Wareheim as Van Harman
 Jeffrey Jensen as Cargill
 James Murphy as Ben
 Gregg Turkington as Bobby
 Kate Lyn Sheil as the waitress
 Liza Kate as Swanson's sister-in-law
 Alexia Rasmussen as the young woman
 Richard Swift as Richard

Reception 
The film received mixed reviews from critics. It received an aggregate rating of 47% on Rotten Tomatoes based on 34 reviews, and 46% on Metacritic based on the opinions of 15 critics (indicating "mixed or average reviews"). For example, David Lewis of the San Francisco Chronicle wrote that the film was "one of the most self-indulgent, pretentious and unfunny movies of the year", while Scott Tobias of The A.V. Club gave the film an "A−" rating, writing that "few films have better articulated the limits of irony as a force field against the world". Aaron Hillis of The Village Voice called it "transgressively brilliant... an itchy critique of entitlement starring avant-garde comedian Tim Heidecker as one of Williamsburg's overprivileged". The film has drawn comparisons to both La Dolce Vita and The Idiots.

The film had a limited theatrical release, grossing $41,113 in four theaters over eight weeks.

See also
The Disintegration Loops-featured on the film's soundtrack
New Sincerity
Criticism of postmodernism
White privilege
Alternative comedy

References

External links 
 
 
 

2012 films
American drama films
Films set in Brooklyn
Films shot in New York City
2010s English-language films
2010s American films